The Professional Box Lacrosse Association (PBLA) is a nascent men's professional box lacrosse league in the United States. The league was announced June 29, 2022, with the first seven (of nine) team locations announced on July 19.

The league intends to focus on growing the sport in the United States, drawing players, coaches, and other personnel primarily from there.

On January 30, 2023, it was announced to the players by e:mail that the league was shutting down operations for this season and hopes to reorganize and return in the future.

Teams
The league will start out with a single-ownership structure, with all teams being league-operated.  Nine teams are planned for the inaugural season. Names for each team will be nominated and voted on by fans from the host cities.

All teams whose names have been announced were decided by a name-the-team contest. The winners were announced on August, 14th, 2022. The Syracuse Spark were originally going to be called the "Sparkle Muffins" however due to the mouthful that this name would be it was shortened to Spark, the logo and mascot are expected to still be a spider.

References

External links
 Official website

Sports leagues established in 2022
Sports leagues in the United States
Professional sports leagues in the United States